Avenir may refer to:

Entertainment
 "Avenir" (song), a 2014 song by Louane Emera
 Avenir: Mirai, Kaori Iida's third studio album
 Avenir, a fictional company in the game Hyperdimension Neptunia
 Avenir, former name of StoryMill, a novel-writing application

Organizations
 Avenir Suisse, a free-market think tank 
 Avenir Telecom, a telecommunications company
 Avenir AS (no) - IT company from Norway
 Avenir Foundation, a charitable foundation run by descendants of Homer L. Dodge

Other
 Avenir (given name), Russian male first name
 Avenir (typeface), a typeface designed by Adrian Frutiger
 Avenir, Alberta, Canada
 Buick Avenir, a concept car
 Nissan Avenir, an automobile

See also
 L'Avenir (disambiguation)